Wylo a composite clipper was built by Robert Steele & Company, Greenock, and launched on 15 April 1869. Robert Steele & Company also built the famous clippers Ariel and Taeping who took part in the great tea race of 1866, and Sir Lancelot another renown clipper ship.

Wylo was the 174th and last vessel to be built by Robert Steele & Company. She was 192.9 ft in length, had a beam of 32.1 ft, a depth of 20.2 feet and measured 829 Gross register tons.

The Figurehead of Wylo still exists in the Fries Scheepvaart Museum in Sneek, the Netherlands.  Item number FSM-J-122.  A multi-colour painted image of a Moor with skirt and bared upper body. The head of the Moor is adorned with a turban. In the ears earrings. The pedestal is decorated with a spiral and leaf and diamond motifs. A finger has been broken off the right hand. The name Wylo is derived from Chinese, it would mean 'speed'.

Killick Martin & Company

Wylo was built for Killick Martin & Company, led by Captain James Killick. She was a sister ship to Kaisow in the Killick Martin fleet, which was the 173rd vessel, and second from last to be built by Robert Steele & Company. Wylo was one of three ships brought by Killick Martin & Company, who also acquired Mikao & Osaka.
Wylo's maiden journey was on 1 June 1869 under Captain Henry Wray Browne, a former Captain of the Killick Martin & Company owned Challenger, where Wylo sailed to shanghai in 103 days, and returned on 22 October with a cargo of tea in 103 days.

Further Transits made by Wylo (1870-1885) were:

1870 February 11 - May 25 Sailed from London to Fuzhou in 103 days.

1870 August 18 - December 11 Sailed from Fuzhou to London in 115 days.

1871 January 10 - April 29 Sailed from London to Rangoon in 109 days.

1871 May 23 - August 31 Sailed from Rangoon to Falmouth in 99 days.

1871 October 12 - January 30 Sailed from London to Shanghai in 110 days.

1872 September 21 - December 15 Sailed from Indramayoe, Java, to Falmouth in 80 days.

1873 March 20 - June 27 Sailed from Hamburg to Hong Kong in 99 days.

1873 September 24 - February 15 Sailed from Manilla to New York in 144 days.

1876 April 14 - July 22 Sailed from London to Shanghai in 99 days.

1879 February 24 - May 16 Sailed from London to Melbourne in 81 days.

1883 Sailed from San Francisco to Queenstown in 111 days.

1884 Sailed from San Francisco to Barrow in 104 days.

1885 January 8 Left Barrow for Victoria, BC.

In 1878 Wylo was re-rigged as a Barque to reduce manning and operational costs.

On 1 April 1885, on her last voyage for Killick Martin & Company she put into Port Stanley in the Falkland Islands, partially dismasted after having lost her bulwarks, stanchions and mizzen mast off Cape Horn. She was not the only casualty of bad weather at this time as the Windsor Castle from Swansea and the Confluentia from Shields, both bound for Valparaíso also put into Port Stanley damaged. Wylo's repairs took one month before she resumed her passage to Vancouver Island.

William Ross and James Ross

In 1886 she was sold to William Ross, London, who 4 days later sold her to James Ross, Quebec for £2375. Later that year on a voyage from Barbados to Montreal, Wylo was in collision at Quebec with the French steamer Henri IV. Wylo was badly damaged and beached on the Louise Embankment to prevent her sinking, but was later condemned and broken up in situ.

The figure head of Wylo is currently on display in the Fries Scheepvaart Museum the Netherlands.

Wylo Artwork
The maritime artist James Brereton has painted Wylo, and images of her are still being produced today.

References

The China Clippers; Basil Lubbock; 1914.

External links
Fried Scheepvaart Museum
Killick Martin & Company 
James Brereton

Tea clippers
Individual sailing vessels
Victorian-era merchant ships of the United Kingdom
Ships built in Scotland
Shipwrecks